Turf Politics is the fourth studio album by rapper Messy Marv.

Track listing
 "What!" (featuring C-Bo)
 "For a Life Time"
 "Turf Politics"
 "Pimping and Hoing" (skit)
 "Hoe 4 Me" (featuring Rappin' 4-Tay)
 "Cuzzin"
 "Who Woulda Known" (featuring The Soul Child)
 "Mafia Shift" (skit)
 "Thug Life"
 "Center of Attention" (featuring E-40 and B-Legit)
 "Twisted" (featuring George Clinton)
 "Dream On"
 "Nikki"

References
 http://www.cduniverse.com/search/xx/music/pid/6674308/a/Turf+Politics.htm

2002 albums
Messy Marv albums
Gangsta rap albums by American artists